During the 1967–68 English football season, Brentford competed in the Football League Fourth Division. Weathering the storm of a severe financial crisis for the second successive season, the threadbare squad managed a mid-table finish.

Season summary 
The positive outcome of the events of 19 January 1967 meant that Brentford would stay in business long enough to compete in the 1967–68 Fourth Division season. A syndicate headed by Ron Blindell had taken over the shares of former chairman Jack Dunnett and assumed control of the club, with Blindell as chairman. With a £100,000 debt (equivalent to £ in ) needing to be paid by 30 June 1968, drastic cost-cutting measures were enacted at Griffin Park. Brentford's reserve and youth teams were scrapped and a mass clear-out of the squad led to just 16 professionals being retained. Having been installed in the role full-time, manager Jimmy Sirrel was permitted to sign a small number of players, including Chelsea youth product Alan Nelmes and Charlton Athletic's inside forward Cliff Myers.

Injuries to John Richardson and George Thomson prior to the opening match of the season left Brentford with just 15 fit players and a lack of personnel would be a running saga during the campaign. Regular goals from John Docherty and Ian Lawther in the early months of the season helped Brentford tread water in mid-table and then slowly rise towards the promotion places, coming as high as 6th place by early December 1967. Hopes of money-raising runs in the FA Cup and League Cup were extinguished with first round defeats in each competition, but chairman Blindell had revealed the positive news in November that the club was more or less breaking even. 9 defeats and just one victory in a 12-match spell between December 1967 and February 1968 undid all the good early-season work and dropped the Bees back into mid-table. Manager Sirrel was permitted to spend £12,000 on attackers Ron Fenton and Allan Mansley in January 1968, but was forced to sell Cliff Myers and top-scorer John Docherty to balance the books.

By March 1968, spiralling debts and the "Brentford Borough" saga threatened the club's existence for the second time in a year. With £70,000 of the £135,000 debt needed to be paid in June 1968, former director Walter Wheatley stepped in and provided the club with a £69,000 interest-fee loan, repayable in 12 months. On the pitch, the team had experienced something of a revival, winning five matches and drawing two of a 9-match spell between late February and early April, but the retirement of George Thomson and the departure of Eddie Reeve left manager Jimmy Sirrel with just 14 players with which to complete the season. Brentford finished in 14th place and used just 18 outfield players during the course of the season.

League table

Results
Brentford's goal tally listed first.

Legend

Football League Fourth Division

FA Cup

Football League Cup 

 Sources: 100 Years Of Brentford, Statto

Playing squad 
Players' ages are as of the opening day of the 1967–68 season.

 Sources: 100 Years Of Brentford, Timeless Bees

Coaching staff

Statistics

Appearances and goals
Substitute appearances in brackets.

Players listed in italics left the club mid-season.
Source: 100 Years Of Brentford

Goalscorers 

Players listed in italics left the club mid-season.
Source: 100 Years Of Brentford

Management

Summary

Transfers & loans

Notes

References 

Brentford F.C. seasons
Brentford